Pseudocellus barberi is a species of arachnid in the order Ricinulei. They can be found in Guatemala and Honduras. The type specimen was found in Guatemala.

References

 Catalogue of the Smaller Arachnid Orders of the World, Mark S. Harvey

Animals described in 1980
Ricinulei